Cystoagaricus is a genus of fungi in the family Psathyrellaceae. The genus contains four species found in subtropical America. The genus was circumscribed by mycologist Rolf Singer in 1947, with Cystoagaricus strobilomyces as the type species.

Species 
, Index Fungorum accepted 9 species of Cystoagaricus.

Cystoagaricus trisulphuratus is a species complex that is nowadays often placed in genus Agaricus.

References

External links

Psathyrellaceae
Cystoagaricus
Taxa named by Rolf Singer